Edward H. Murphy is a former senior executive and board member of the American Petroleum Institute.

Education
Edward Murphy obtained his BA in Economics from Fordham University and his Ph.D from Rutgers University.

Career
Edward Murphy has been employed at the American Petroleum Institute in a variety of positions, beginning in 1975, and he retired from the Institute as Group Director for Industry Operations and Downstream in 2007. He has been outspoken in defense of the petroleum industry and appeared in the 2006 film, Who Killed the Electric Car as an interviewee, in which he stated: "I differ strongly with that. We did not kill the electric car. The petroleum industry did not kill the electric car, what killed the electric car was antiquated technology. It's a good example of something we should not repeat, it's something we need to avoid."

Publications

References 

20th-century American businesspeople
American businesspeople in the oil industry
Fordham University alumni
Rutgers University alumni
Living people
Year of birth missing (living people)